George Parkin (11 October 1864 – 6 August 1933) was an Australian cricketer. He played in seven first-class matches for South Australia between 1889 and 1894.

See also
 List of South Australian representative cricketers

References

External links
 

1864 births
1933 deaths
Australian cricketers
South Australia cricketers
Cricketers from Adelaide